{{Infobox musical artist
| name             = Ishaan Ghosh
| origin           = India
| image            = File:Ishaan Ghosh playing Tabla.jpg
| caption          = Ghosh reciting some Bols and playing the Tabla
| birth_date       =   
| genre            = Hindustani classical music
| occupation       = Musician, Classical player
| instruments      = Tabla
| years_active     = 2002–present
| website          = 
| honorific_prefix = | associated_acts  = ARAJ
}}

Ishaan Ghosh is the son and disciple of the Tabla and Sitar maestro Pandit Nayan Ghosh. Ishaan is a Tabla player from the Farrukhabad Gharana.

Performing career
Ishaan was born on 20 May 2000 to Pandit Nayan Ghosh. 

He is the grandson of the 20th-century Tabla player Padmabhushan Pandit Nikhil Ghosh and the grand-nephew of the flautist Pandit Pannalal Ghosh. His uncle is Pandit Dhruba Ghosh. Ishaan gave his first Tabla solo recital when he was 2 years old.

Ghosh has performed with players of Indian classical music including his father Pandit Nayan Ghosh, Pandit Jasraj, Ustad Amjad Ali Khan, Pandit Buddhadev Das Gupta, Ustad Aashish Khan, Ustad Nishat Khan, Pandit Tejendra Narayan Majumdar, violin legend Dr. N Rajam, Kaushiki Chakraborty, Rahul Deshpande, Rakesh Chaurasia and Purbayan Chatterjee.

He is also a speaker at various youth platforms including TEDx.

ARAJARAJ'' is an Indian classical collaboration conceptualized by Ishaan Ghosh and is a group of exceptionally gifted young North Indian classical musicians.

Pandit Nayan Ghosh - Musical Mentor and Sitar

Ishaan Ghosh - Tabla

S. Akash - Flute

Mehtab Ali Niazi - Sitar

Vanraj Shastri - Sarangi

Pratik Singh - Vocals & Tabla

Awards

He was awarded with the ‘Baba Allauddin Khan Yuva Puraskar’ by the Government of Madhya Pradesh in 2012, the ‘Achievement Award’ by President Jimmy Carter in 2016 & the ‘Rising Star Award’ in 2019.

See also 

 Pandit Nayan Ghosh
 Pandit Nikhil Ghosh
 Pandit Pannalal Ghosh
 Pandit Jnan Prakash Ghosh
 Ustad Ahmed Jan Thirakwa
 Dhruba Ghosh

References

Tabla players
2000 births
Living people